Built from Scratch is the second studio album by New York City DJ group The X-Ecutioners. It was released on February 26, 2002, through Loud Records and Columbia Records. The album was produced by Beat Junkies, Chris Frantz, CJ Moore, Dan the Automator, DJ Apollo, DJ Premier, Kenny Muhammad The Human Orchestra, Knobody, Large Professor, Lo-Fidelity Allstars, Mike Shinoda of American rock band Linkin Park, Sean Cane, The X-Ecutioners, Tina Weymouth, and was executive produced by Peter Kang.

Background 
In a reviewing article for Resident Advisor, it clearly describes The X-Ecutioners as a "four-man DJ battle group as a team that consists of Rob Swift, Mista Sinista, Total Eclipse and Roc Raida coming out with a new album, Built from Scratch, to take the music genre of turntablism from an underground phenomenon to a more accessible sound. The record is more than a P.Diddy record, as it is a straight up hip-hop record of 2002 using the techniques being more built up from the days when Grandmaster Flash had his own adventure behind the wheel."

"No hip-hop record is complete nowadays without the usual intro," as described from the article via Resident Advisor, "and ever since producer Prince Paul (formerly De La) brought them out the Skit. A lot of albums really have skits that are wack and get way too played out. However, The X-Ecutioners pulled off decent skits and incorporated a lot of scratching routines into 'em, as well as being quite funny." The skit, entitled "You Can't Scratch" that appears on this album, is carefully described well.

"The album isn't just about skits," continuously being described from Resident Advisor, "but all about the hip-hop music and turntablism, and proper tracks that have all been done quite well. All the skits and the songs appear on this album as listed in the record."

Tracks 
"Intro", which features Vinroc, Apollo and Shortkut of the Triple Threat DJ's, has all the mad scratching DJ's in the states that are Flipino's mainly on the west coast of San Francisco to be exact, as they represented quite well for the album. "XL", which features Large Professor, has a smooth head nodding hip-hop track with one of the most and greatest emcees on the Main Source with a sound that is familiar. "X-ecutioners Scratch" has an old-school sketchy madness, which people can recognize a lot of cuts on the track as the X-Men takes them on a hip-hop history lesson with the same kind of vibe that goes for all scratchy tracks on the record. "A Journey Into Sound", which features Kenny Mohammed, who can beatbox in this track, compliments their style very well as they cut up the battle breaks with proficient technology.

"Let It Bang", which features rap duo M.O.P., is a bit of a tribute to the classical track, entitled "Ante Up", getting the feeling to start any party with their hardcore rhyme delivery and production, which makes it almost sound like a rock song. "X-Ecutioners (Theme) Song)", which features Dan the Automator, has a signature Automator feel, making it a real head nodding hip-hop, which sounds like a track from a Handsome Boy Modeling School album, digging a juggling routine as they create their own drumming pattern while using battle records. Besides the "You Can't Scratch" skit appearing on the record as the tenth track, "It's Goin' Down", which features Mike Shinoda and Joe Hahn (Mr. Hahn) of American rock band Linkin Park, has a rap rock style to expect from Linkin Park being taken into the X-Ecution chamber, ready to be finally cut up, getting a lot of the JJJ play already, and is quite a decent track with a pretty average and flawless rap from Shinoda. An instrumental version of "It's Goin' Down" on the 12" format is included in the single that was released in March 2002. The single samples "Dedicated (Demo 1999)" from the LP Underground 2.0 EP, "Step Up" from the Hybrid Theory EP, and "Year 2000" by Xzibit. "Premier's X-ecution", which features DJ Premier, who puts his signature as a smooth hip-hop production style on the track as the X-Men cut onto the top. "The X (Y'all Know the Name)", which features Pharoahe Monch, Xzibit, Inspectah Deck, and Skillz, picked a creme de le creme of emcees who can easily flow to the beat. After cutting up samples for "3 Boroughs", Pharoahe Monch makes an appearance on the track and kicks some real flows, as Xzibit never fails to flow with the impression on his usual gruff voice delivery, while Inspectah Deck shows his versatility Wu-Tanger style and kicks some decent lines from his raps, and Skillz delivers mad skills on the mic.

"Genius of Love 2002", which is a partial cover of Tom Tom Club's "Genius of Love", features Tom Tom Club and Biz Markie on the track with his usual comical rhyme delivery. "B-Boy Rock 2001", which features Everlast, has more piano sampling hip-hop beats, not making it as crazy as Busta Rhymes' "Woo-Hah", as Everlast flows gets pretty stocky as a standard House of Pain style that works pretty well on the record. Besides the "Who Wants to Be a Motherfuckin' Millionaire" skit, listed as "Who Wants to Be a M*****F*****' Millionaire" on the back cover of the audio compact disc, "Play That Beat", which features uncredited rap vocals from Fatman Scoop on the record, is the track that could follow the path, after hearing the sampling club anthem of "Be Faithful" by Faith Evans. It is another history lesson in hip-hop with a hip-hop classic sample, as Fatman Scoop goes nuts for the mic, teaching people how to dance with the shout to who the DJ's are on the record. However, a Lo-Fidelity All Stars Remix of "Play That Beat" has a bit more of a disco groove with Fatman Scoop getting on the less annoying side and the vocoder adds the extra bit of funk. "Dramacyde", which features Big Pun and Kool G Rap, has a thug style rap that flows from the hip-hop originator of gangsta rap and Big Pun, who died on February 7, 2000, from suffering a fatal heart attack and respiratory failure at a Crowne Plaza Hotel while staying with his family before the album's slated release in September 2001. Kool G Rap's flows sound similar of the contributed UNKLE release, but the song shows off more of X-Men instead of the emcees. "X-ecution of a Bum Rush", which features the Beat Junkies (consisting of DJ Babu and rapper J-Rocc), has more of the east coast against the west coast turntablism, and a great ending to the album with hip-hop samples from both coasts, such as Dilated Peoples, and Gangstarr among others.

History
The record only spawned one hit single from the album, entitled "It's Goin' Down", which was released in March 2002. The single was heavily written, produced, and performed by Linkin Park members Shinoda and Hahn. They both appear in the official music video along with other Linkin Park members, including Rob Bourdon and Dave "Phoenix" Farrell on drums and bass respectively, with Wayne Static from American rock band Static-X on the guitars. However, Bourdon and Phoenix of Linkin Park, and Static of Static-X were all not involved with the recording session for the single in the studio.

The main album cover is based on Public Enemy's first album, Yo! Bum Rush the Show; an alternative cover simply shows the DJ group's logo and album title on a scratched orange surface (similar as the "It's Goin' Down" single cover).

Track listing

Charts

Weekly charts

Year-end charts

References

External links 
 The X-Ecutioners at Rolling Stone Magazine
 The X-Ecutioners at IGN Music

2002 albums
The X-Ecutioners albums
Albums produced by Dan the Automator
Albums produced by DJ Premier
Albums produced by Large Professor
Albums produced by Mike Shinoda